Mahidasht District is a district (bakhsh) in Kermanshah County, Kermanshah Province, Iran. At the 2006 census, its population was 21,399, in 4,885 families.  The District has one city: Robat. The District has two rural districts (dehestan): Chaqa Narges Rural District and Mahidasht Rural District.

See also
Kalhor

References 

Kermanshah County
Districts of Kermanshah Province